The Cuba men's national under-21 volleyball team represents Cuba in international men's volleyball competitions and friendly matches under the age 21 and it is ruled by the Cuban Volleyball Federation body That is an affiliate of the International Volleyball Federation FIVB and also a part of the North, Central America and Caribbean Volleyball Confederation NORCECA.

Results

FIVB U21 World Championship
 Champions   Runners up   Third place   Fourth place

NORCECA U21 Championship
 Champions   Runners up   Third place   Fourth place

Team

Current squad

The following is the Cuban roster in the 2017 FIVB Volleyball Men's U21 World Championship.

Head coach: Nicolas Vives Coffigny

Notable players

References

External links
FIVB profile

National men's under-21 volleyball teams
Volleyball
Volleyball in Cuba
Volleyball